The 1922–23 season was Newport County's third season in the Football League, second season in the Third Division South and third season overall in the third tier.

Season review

Results summary

Results by round

Fixtures and results

Third Division South

FA Cup

Welsh Cup

League table

Pld = Matches played; W = Matches won; D = Matches drawn; L = Matches lost; F = Goals for; A = Goals against;GA = Goal average; Pts = Points

Election

External links
 Newport County 1922–1923 : Results
 Newport County football club match record: 1923
 Welsh Cup 1922/23

References

 Amber in the Blood: A History of Newport County. 

1922–23
English football clubs 1922–23 season
1922–23 in Welsh football